Daniele Caimmi (born 17 December 1972, in Jesi) is an Italian long-distance runner who specializes in the marathon race. His personal best marathon time is 2:08:59 hours, achieved in December 2002 in Milan.

Biography
He finished tenth at the 1999 World Championships, 
fourth at the 2002 European Championships and sixth at the 2003 World Championships.

Achievements

National titles
Daniele Caimmi has won 2 times the individual national championship.
1 win in 10000 metres (2000)
1 win in Half marathon (1999)

See also
Italian all-time lists - Marathon

References

External links
 

1972 births
Living people
Italian male long-distance runners
Italian male marathon runners
Athletes (track and field) at the 2000 Summer Olympics
Athletes (track and field) at the 2004 Summer Olympics
Olympic athletes of Italy
World Athletics Championships athletes for Italy